The Grand Mansouri Mosque is a mosque in Tripoli, Lebanon, also known simply as The Great Mosque of Tripoli. It was built in the Mamluk period, from 1294 to 1298. This was the first building to be erected in Mamluki Tripoli.

History 
The Grand Mansouri Mosque is considered to be the most important aspect of the historic part of Mamluki Tripoli. It was built by Sultan Khalil Qalawun, known as Al-Ashraf in 1294 AD, five years after his father, Sultan Al-Mansur Qalawun defeated the Crusaders and liberated the city in 1289 AD. 

According to one of Tripoli's most famous historians, Dr. Omar Tadmouri, the Grand Mansouri Mosque was built on the ruins of an ancient church, where the main Gothic gate and minaret tower are the remains of a Crusader church. The minaret was formerly the Lombardi tower of the church of Saint Marie-de-Latour. 

It took four years to build the grand mosque. The mosque also served as a madrassah and a community center for the city's population. This role would continue to the present day. 

The mosque has a square shape and an area of 3224 sq meter. The mosque has a special significance to the city, as it is one of the most important religious centers in terms of value, historical representation, spaciousness, and strategic location in the Old City. It played a social, political, and cultural role primarily during the Colonial period where the mosque would serve as the site for non-violent resistance movements against the French Mandate over the city.  

Interestingly, the Grand Mansouri Mosque is not heavily ornate like other Mamluki-era mosques, like Tripoli's iconic Taynal Mosque. The Grand Mansouri Mosque is characterized by its simplicity, a clear and organized design. The center has a square shape where the ablution (wudu) basin lies and is surrounded by corridors from the north, east, and west while the main prayer hall is in the south.   
A visitor can enter the mosque and find to the right of the prayer hall a small space called "The Room of the Holy Sepulcher". This room allegedly includes a hair of the Prophet Muhammad (peace and blessings be upon him) in a box made out of pure gold. The Ottoman Caliph Abdul Hamid II offered this hair as a gift to the inhabitants of the city of Tripoli. The hair is taken out of the box only twice a year, the last Friday in the holy month of Ramadan and after dawn prayer in Laylat al-Qadr (Night of Decree).   

The Hall of the mosque extends along the southern side of the courtyard and has seven large doors and consists of seven massive arches inside. On the southern wall of the prayer hall are two Mihrabs (Niches) and a wooden podium adorned with geometric motifs that date back all the way to the late 13th century.

References

External links

page for the Mosque at the  Tripoli tourist site, based on NINA JIDEJIAN, Tripoli Through the Ages, Dar El-Mashreq Publishers, Beirut
Take a 3D virtual tour inside the Mosque Done by Props Solutions 2019, a Matterport Service partner in Lebanon and the region.

Mamluk architecture in Lebanon
Mosques in Tripoli, Lebanon
Mosque buildings with domes
Tourism in Lebanon
Tourist attractions in Lebanon